Markiewicz is a Polish surname. It is similar to Markowicz and a number of surnames in other languages.

People 
 Alfred John Markiewicz (1928–1997), bishop of the Diocese of Kalamazoo
 Constance Markiewicz (1868-1927), Irish politician
 Jacek Markiewicz (born 1976), Polish footballer
 Kazimierz Dunin-Markiewicz (1874–1932), Polish artist and writer
 Marta Markiewicz (born 1989), Polish singer 
 Piotr Markiewicz (born 1973), Polish canoeist
 Tadeusz Markiewicz (born 1936), Polish sculptor
 Władysław Markiewicz (1920–2017), Polish sociologist
 Władysława Markiewiczówna (1900–1982), Polish pianist and educator

See also
Constance Markievicz,  politician, revolutionary, nationalist, suffragist, socialist

Polish-language surnames
Patronymic surnames